Poplar Beach is a beach located in and operated by the city of Half Moon Bay, California. It lies at the end of Poplar Street west of State Route 1. Located roughly a half mile south of Half Moon Bay State Beach, Poplar Beach allows horses and leashed dogs. It is close to a residential area, and there are no fireworks or beach fires allowed. Poplar Beach is open until sunset and is free to the public (though the nearest parking lot is metered).

The Coastal Trail links Poplar Beach to Half Moon Bay State Beach along the top of a bluff with scenic views of the Pacific Ocean and the Mavericks surfing location to the north. This hiking trail is also open to horses and dogs.

See also
 Half Moon Bay State Beach
 List of beaches in California
 List of California state parks

References

Parks in San Mateo County, California
San Francisco Bay Area beaches
Beaches of San Mateo County, California
Beaches of Northern California